Rosenbergia freneyi is a species of beetle in the family Cerambycidae. It was described by Rigout in 1988.

References

Batocerini
Beetles described in 1988